Kawambwa is a constituency of the National Assembly of Zambia. It covers the town of Kawambwa in Kawambwa District of Luapula Province.

List of MPs

References

Constituencies of the National Assembly of Zambia
1964 establishments in Zambia
Constituencies established in 1964